Anant Kumar (born September 28, 1969 in Katihar/Bihar), is a German author, translator and literary critic of Indian descent. He spent his childhood in Motihari, where his father Rajendra Prasad was Professor at M. S. College, Babasaheb Bhimrao Ambedkar Bihar University. He resides in Kassel, Germany.

Life 
The son of an Indian teacher from Bihar, Kumar went to college from 1991 to 1998 at the GHK (Gesamthochschule Kassel), where he received a master's degree in German literature, writing his thesis on Alfred Döblin’s epic novel Manas.

In his literary works, Kumar connects the experiences of a foreigner in German society with Indian culture. His first work, Fremde Frau, fremder Mann (Foreign Woman, Foreign Man), is characterized by its pithy insights and expressive perceptiveness. The aspects of observational satire and finely ironic comment are constant elements throughout Kumar’s work. In his work Zeru—A Seven Day Story Kumar alludes to the literary form of the epos and brilliantly depicts the colorful array of daily life for an African boy amid wild and ancient myths of the dark continent.

Anant Kumar is a member of the Association of German Authors and the Literary Society of Hessen.

Works

In German

Novel 
 Berlin-Bombay. Aus dem Leben von Dipak Talgeri und Eva Seilmeyer Verlag auf der Warft, Münster 2016, .
 Berlin-Bombay. Die Karriere eines Lehrers, dessen Leben als Hochstapler zugrunde ging Anthea Verlag, Berlin 2020, .

Poetry 

 Fremde Frau – fremder Mann: Ein Inder dichtet in Kassel. Wiesenburg-Verlag, Schweinfurt 1997, 
 Kasseler Texte: Gedichte, Kurzgeschichten, Beobachtungen, Glossen, Skizzen, Reflexionen. Wiesenburg-Verlag, Schweinfurt 1998, 
 ARCHETYPUS. EPLA-Verlag, Ganderkesee 2011, 
 AYSE. custos verlag, Solingen 2020,

Prose 

 Die Inderin: Prosa. Wiesenburg-Verlag, Schweinfurt 1999, 
 Die galoppierende Kuhherde: Essays und andere Prosa. Wiesenburg-Verlag, Schweinfurt 2001, 
 Die uferlosen Geschichten. Wiesenburg-Verlag, Schweinfurt 2003, 
 Drei Kilo Hühne : Grotesken, Glossen, Satiren. Fünf-Finger-Ferlag, Leipzig 2005, 
 Indien I: Süß. IATROS-Verlag, Mainz 2006 
 Indien II: Sauer. IATROS-Verlag, Mainz 2006, 
 Ein Inder in Deutschland. Wiesenburg-Verlag, Schweinfurt 2008, 
 Ibiza: Gespräche, Gedichte und Betrachtungen. Projekte-Verlag, Halle (Saale) 2013, 
 FRIDO - Eine Deutsche Stimme. Der Neue Morgen, Rudolstadt 2013, 
 Chili Chicken. chiliverlag, Verl 2015,

Children Books 

 ... und ein Stück für Dich: Ein Bilderbuch für Kinder und Erwachsene. Geest-Verlag, Ahlhorn 2000, 
 Zeru: Eine siebentägige Geschichte. Wiesenburg-Verlag, Schweinfurt 2005, 
 Der Mond und seine Langeweile: Ein Bilder- und Malbuch für die großen und kleinen Kinder & für das Kind im Erwachsenen. Epla-Verlag, Ganderkesee 2009, 
 Halli Galli in Gotha. chiliverlag, Verl 2015,

Non fiction 

 Indien: Eine Weltmacht! mit inneren Schwächen. 13 Essays $ Kolumnen. Der Neue Morgen, Rudolstadt 2012, 
 Blicke auf Gotha, Kumars Gothaer Kolumnen: Deutschland von Innen und Außen. Stadtverwaltung Gotha, Gotha 2015
 Ostdeutschland ist Viefalt, Essays-Reportagen-Gedichte., Berlin 2019, .

In English 

 Stories Without Borders. Wiesenburg-Verlag, Schweinfurt 2010, 
 The Boredom of the Moon. Epla, Ganderkesee 2014, 
 AYSE. custos verlag, Solingen 2020,

Awards 
 2000: Talk and symposium on contemporary literature “Poetry & Short Prose”, BBS Osterholz-Scharmbeck in cooperation with literary institution Friedrich-Bödecker-Kreis, Lower Saxony
 2002: Finalist in the Würth-Literatur-Preis, (Tübingen Poetry-Lectureship)
 2003: Poeticus-Shortshtory-Preis, Spittal an der Drau, Austria
 2003: Scholarship from Stiftung kunst:raum sylt quelle, Sylt
 2004: Finalist, May-Ayim-Award (Poetry), Berlin
 2006: Rudolf-Descher-Feder, Annual Award from Association of Authors IGdA e. V.
 2010: Finalist, 14th Short Story Contest, h+s veranstaltungen GmbH, Munich
 2011: Grant/Scholarship from Ministry of Science and Culture, State of Hess, Germany for the collection of stories “FRIDO – A German Voice”, scheduled in Fall 2011
 2012: Finalist, Geertje Potash-Suhr Prize for prose in German, SCALG, Colorado
 2013: “Adjunct Visiting Lecturer II”, German Summer School, Taos, The University of New Mexico in consortium with California State University Long Beach, 25. Juni 25 – 26. July
 2014: Work Grant from Ministry of Science and Culture, State of Hess, Germany for the novel “DIPAK TALGRI`s COLLAPSE”, scheduled in Winter 2014-15
 2015: Resident Writer Award of Royal City Gotha, Free State of Thuringia, Germany
 2016: Winner Short Story Contest „Keller, Schlüssel“, Ruhrliteratur, Bochum, Germany
 2016: Grant/Scholarship “Dramatic and Essayistic writing”, Summer School, Velturno, Italy
 2016: 1st Finalist, Siegfried-Pater-Prize(Mouthpiece for Justice), Retap Publishing, Düsseldorf, Germany
 2017: Resident Writer "Autorencamp", Cologne Muehlheim
 2017: University of Wuerzburg, Dept. of English, LITERATURE IN A GLOBALIZED WORLD: CREATIVE AND CRITICAL PERSPECTIVES
 2020: Grant/Scholarship "AYSE" (Alhambra-Poetry), Ministry of Science and Culture, State of Hess, Germany
 2021: Grant/Scholarship "IN PANDEMIC TIMES / IN ZEITEN der PANDEMIE" (Essay), Hessische Kulturstiftung, Germany

References

 Banerjee, Mita. "Travelling Theory, Reshaping Disciplines? Envisioning Asian Germany through Asian Australian Studies". Journal of Intercultural Studies, Volume 27, No. 1/2, February 2006, pp. 167–185. (back)
 Brisson, Ulrike. "Sansibar oder der wirkliche Grund : Drama in a College German Language Class". Scenario, No. 1, 2007. (back)
 Cheesman, Tom & Kulkarni, Sukanya. "Dancing Words and Dancing in Diaspora". Dimension2, Contemporary German-Language Literature, Volume 9, No. 1/2, Nacogdoches. (back)
 Fedtke, Jana. Bitter-sweet Universality as a Catalyst for Change in Anant Kumar’s Indien I: Süß and Indien II: Sauer. University of South Carolina, Columbia, 2006. (back)
 Kumpf, Kirsten. Improvement through movement : A thematic and linguistic analysis of german minority writing through the works of Anant Kumar. Graduate College of The University of Iowa, Iowa, 2005. (back)
 Mehta, Amrit. "Identitätsdivergenz eines indischen Autors in Deutschland". Symposium: „Kommunikation und Konflikt“, Universität Salzburg, Wien, 2006. (German) (back)
 Schomacker, Tim. Multikulti mit feinen Rissen in Die Tageszeitung newspaper, March 15, 2000. (German) (back)
 Veteto-Conrad, Marilya. "German Minority Literature : Tongues Set Free & Pointed Tongues". The International Fiction Review, No.28 . (back)
 Shen, Qinna. "“The Nomadic Subject in Emine Sevgi Özdamar, Herta Müller and Anant Kumar”". Response paper at the 17th Annual German Graduate Student Conference “The Outsider Within,” Panel “Immigrants / Postcoloniality”, Department of German, Yale University, April 2006. (back)
 Freier, Monika. "“Die Neuverortung von Migrationsliteratur am Beispiel der deutsch-indischen Schriftsteller R. Singh und A. Kumar”". Hamburg University, 2004. (German) (back)
 Kumpf Baele, Kirsten E. “Ich bin verliebt in die deutsche Sprache”: Anant Kumar mythicizing German?. 2011 Kentucky Foreign Language Conference, Lexington 2011 (back)

External links 
 
 Official Internet Debut by Anant Kunar
 D + C Development & Cooperation, Frankfurt/Main: "In the constituency, it doesn't matter" Hans Dembowski und Anant Kumar on "Indian English Literature"
 Interview with Anant Kumar: "Polyphony and Contradictions Are Considered Indispensable in India"
  Words Without Borders, CHICAGO-IL, May 2010: Mean Girls and Bad Boys Poetry by Anant Kumar, Translated from German into English by Marilya Veteto Reese
 THE EMPIRE STRIKES BACK: DIE POSTKOLONIALE INDISCHE LITERATUR VON AUSSEN NACH INNEN Babilónia nº8/9, pp. 49 – 57, Lissabon, December 2010, Dossier by Anant Kumar
 Transpoetry, Cardiff University School of European Languages, Translation and Politics. Poetry-Workshop 2012 by Anant Kumar

1969 births
Living people
German essayists
21st-century German novelists
German male essayists
German male novelists
21st-century essayists
21st-century German male writers